Kid 90 is a 2021 American documentary film directed and produced by Soleil Moon Frye. The film follows Moon Frye who carried a camera around with her everywhere she went. Leonardo DiCaprio serves as an executive producer under his Appian Way Productions banner.

Synopsis
In the 1990s, Soleil Moon Frye carried a video camera with her everywhere she went. David Arquette, Balthazar Getty, Brian Austin Green, Stephen Dorff, Mark-Paul Gosselaar, Danny Boy O'Connor, Heather McComb appear in the film, while Harold Hunter, Justin Pierce, Jenny Lewis, Sara Gilbert, Charlie Sheen, Leonardo DiCaprio, Mark Wahlberg, Corey Feldman, Michael Rapaport, and Jonathan Brandis appear in the film through footage shot by Frye.

One of the major narratives of the documentary was her many friends who died at a young age from suicide or drug overdose, including Jonathan Brandis, Shannon Wilsey, Rodney Harvey, Harold Hunter, and Justin Pierce.

Production
Soleil Moon Frye spent four years going through footage she had shot, diaries, and voicemails, from when she was a teenage girl in the 1990s. Initially planning to make the film not about herself, she began reaching out to friends from that period regardless if she had remained friends or drifted apart from them. When deciding to include herself in the film, she asked a consulting editor on the project to interview her in the film. Jonathan Brandis's parents approved of footage of him appearing in the film.

In August 2020, it was announced Leonardo DiCaprio would serve as an executive producer under his Appian Way Productions banner, with STX Entertainment also producing the film.

Release
It was released on March 12, 2021.

Reception 
Kid 90 holds a 76% approval rating on review aggregator website Rotten Tomatoes, based on 34 reviews, with a weighted average of 7.1/10. The website's consensus reads, "It's insular and uneven, but Kid 90 also presents a raw and affecting first-person look at the experience of growing up in the spotlight." On Metacritic, the film holds a rating of 67 out of 100, based on 9 critics, indicating "generally favorable reviews."

Zach Ruskin for the San Francisco Chronicle gave the film a "Little Man Clapping", roughly translating to a 4/5 stars, opining "Other documentaries have made this point in grander, more artistic ways, but there is value in seeing this raw footage that accompanies an adolescence spent in front of the camera."

References

External links
 
 
 

2021 films
2021 documentary films
Appian Way Productions films
Biographical documentary films
Hulu original films
STX Entertainment films
2020s English-language films